Footprint Center (formerly known as America West Arena, US Airways Center, Talking Stick Resort Arena and Phoenix Suns Arena) is a multi-purpose arena in Phoenix, Arizona.

Built in the regional population center of the southwestern United States, the arena opened on June 6, 1992, at a construction cost of $89 million.

It is currently the home arena for the Phoenix Suns of the National Basketball Association (NBA), the Phoenix Mercury of the Women's National Basketball Association (WNBA) and the Indoor Football League's Arizona Rattlers. The ECHL's Phoenix RoadRunners also played there from 2005 until they ceased operations at the conclusion of the 2008–2009 season. Additionally, the National Hockey League (NHL)'s Phoenix Coyotes (now the Arizona Coyotes) played their first 7-plus seasons at the arena following their arrival in Phoenix on July 1, 1996.

These two major league sports venues are half of those used by Phoenix area professional teams, the other two being State Farm Stadium and Mullett Arena in the neighboring Phoenix suburbs of Glendale and Tempe.

Sports teams and events
Basketball, arena football, concerts, ice shows and other events such as wrestling are held in the arena.

Capacity
The capacities are 17,071 for basketball, 16,210 for ice hockey and indoor football, 17,716 for in-the-round concerts, 12,565 for end stage concerts, and 4,379 for theater events.

Early years
The Coyotes hosted their first regular season home game in Arizona at the arena on October 10, 1996, with a 4–1 win over the San Jose Sharks. They finished the 1996–97 season with a 38–37–7 record to qualify for the Stanley Cup playoffs. That playoff appearance was short-lived, with a Game 7 loss to the Anaheim Ducks in the Western Conference Quarterfinals. Just over 7 years later, the team played their last home game within Phoenix city limits with a 5–2 loss to the Minnesota Wild on December 15, 2003.

The arena also hosted the Arizona Sandsharks of the defunct Continental Indoor Soccer League (CISL).

Nickname
Its most common nickname is "The Purple Palace", though during the Rattlers' season it is known as "The Snake Pit".

NBA
Capacity for basketball games was originally 19,023, but was downsized after the 2002–03 season to 18,422 and further downsized to 18,055 before the 2014–15 season.

The arena has seen its share of basketball moments. Less than a year after its opening, it hosted 3 championship games of the 1993 NBA Finals between the Suns and the Chicago Bulls. The Mercury hosted WNBA Finals games in 1998, 2007, 2009, 2014 and 2021. The 1995 NBA All-Star Game, 2000 WNBA All-Star Game and 2009 NBA All-Star Game. were played at the arena.

AFL
The Arizona Rattlers have hosted four ArenaBowl games, with three played at Footprint Center. They won ArenaBowl XI with a 55–33 win over the Iowa Barnstormers on August 25, 1997. They lost in their only championship game appearance at Gila River Arena, a 56–42 ArenaBowl XXIX loss to the Philadelphia Soul on August 26, 2016.

Boxing
Among the notable boxing events held in Phoenix, they include Oscar De La Hoya's early bouts, Michael Carbajal's WBO world Junior Flyweight title against Josue Camacho in 1994 and Julio César Chávez ended his career with a fight at the arena.

Bull riding
In bull riding, the Professional Bull Riders hosted a Built Ford Tough Series (formerly the Bud Light Cup) at the arena between 1999 and 2002. The annual event moved to Giendale in 2004 before it returned to downtown Phoenix in March 2014.

MMA/UFC
In MMA, the arena has hosted several noteworthy UFC events including UFC on Fox: dos Santos vs. Miocic, UFC Fight Night: Rodríguez vs. Penn, UFC on ESPN: Ngannou vs. Velasquez and UFC 274: Oliveira vs. Gaethje.

Professional wrestling
The arena has also hosted various professional wrestling events, including:                                                                      
 SummerSlam (2003)
 Judgment Day (2006)
 Cyber Sunday (2008)
 WWE SmackDown, August 28, 2009
 WWE Raw, March 29, 2010 (the first Raw since WrestleMania XXVI)
 Money in the Bank (2012)
 WWE Raw, June 20, 2016
 Elimination Chamber (2017)
 WWE Raw, February 19, 2018
 WWE SmackDown, February 20, 2018
 NXT TakeOver: Phoenix and the following Raw and SmackDown events as part of that year's Royal Rumble weekend                                         
 WWE Raw, September 30, 2019 (served as the season premiere of Raw, with a new logo, new commentary team (Vic Joseph, Jerry Lawler, Dio Maddin), new theme song (Legendary by Skillet), and a new stage design)
 WWE SmackDown, August 20, 2021 (first WWE event the arena hosted since the COVID-19 pandemic, and final SmackDown before that year's SummerSlam took place the next day)
 WWE SmackDown, July 1, 2022 (final SmackDown before that year's Money in the Bank took place the next day)
 All Elite Wrestling: Live Dynamite broadcast and Rampage taping, February 22, 2023
 WWE Raw, March 27, 2022 (final Raw before WrestleMania 39)

Concerts and other events
Frank Sinatra gave one of his last concerts on December 10, 1993, in the arena.

As part of their Keep the Faith Tour, Bon Jovi performed in the arena on March 11, 1993.

Gloria Estefan played here on July 30, 1996, during her “Evolution” World Tour.

Van Halen made a stop in Phoenix on April 1, 1995, as part of their The Balance "Ambulance" Tour.

Shakira performed at the arena on January 31, 2003 during the Tour of the Mongoose. She later brought her Oral Fixation Tour to the arena on August 11, 2006. She returned to the arena on August 26, 2018 for her El Dorado World Tour.

Depeche Mode performed during 3 separate tours at the arena. They were on December 14, 1998 (Singles Tour), August 10, 2001 (Exciter Tour) and August 23, 2009 (Tour of the Universe). Their 2009 show had 7,635 people in attendance and was recorded for the band's live albums project Recording the Universe.

Miley Cyrus performed at the arena for her Bangerz Tour on February 27, 2014.

Ariana Grande performed at the arena on April 6, 2015 as part of The Honeymoon Tour. She kicked off her Dangerous Woman Tour at the arena on February 3, 2017. She later brought her Sweetener World Tour to the arena on May 14, 2019.

Fleetwood Mac performed at the arena on November 28, 2018, during their An Evening with Fleetwood Mac tour. It took place in the hometown of their lead singer Stevie Nicks.

Earlier that month, Twenty One Pilots held a second show there as part of their The Bandito Tour.
They returned to the arena for their The Icy Tour on September 16, 2022. 

On August 30, 2021, Guns N' Roses held a show as a part of their 2020 Tour.

On October 17, 2021, J.Cole performed at the arena for his The Off-Season Tour.

On February 8, 2022, Tyler, the Creator performed at the Footprint Center for his first show on the Call Me If You Get Lost Tour.

On February 19, 2022, Andrea Bocelli performed at the Footprint Center for his United States Tour.

On March 1, 2022, Satanic Doo-Wop Band Twin Temple, Danish metal band Volbeat, and Swedish metal band Ghost Performed at the Footprint Center on the final leg of their US Tour.

On March 20, 2022, Dua Lipa performed a sold out show as part of her Future Nostalgia Tour, with Megan Thee Stallion and Caroline Polachek as her opening acts.

On September 10, 2022,Kendrick Lamar performed at the Footprint Center for The Big Steppers Tour With Baby Keem and Tanna Leone as opening acts on the show.

On September 21, 2022, Michael Bublé performed at the Footprint Center for his Higher Tour.

On December 4, 2022, Trans-Siberian Orchestra performed 2 shows at the Footprint Center for their 2022 Winter Tour.

The Footprint Center acted as the venue for Opening Night activities for Super Bowl LVII on February 6, 2023.

History
Construction began on August 1, 1990, as former Suns owner Jerry Colangelo envisioned a need for a new arena to be built in Phoenix to replace Arizona Veterans Memorial Coliseum. About 27 months later, Footprint Center was officially inaugurated with the Suns' 1992–1993 season opening 111–105 victory over the Los Angeles Clippers on November 7, 1992. Simultaneously, it also was Charles Barkley's first regular season game as a Sun. Despite the fact that the Suns had lost the 1993 NBA Finals to the Chicago Bulls, a parade was still held and attracted more than 300,000 Suns fans. It made its way through downtown Phoenix and finished at the new arena.

NHL years

When the original Winnipeg Jets publicly announced their intention to relocate to Phoenix for the 1996–97 NHL season, the arena was quickly reconfigured to accommodate ice hockey. Unlike most multipurpose arenas, it was not designed with an ice hockey rink in mind. Its tight seating configuration suits basketball very well, but made it logistically difficult to fit a standard NHL rink onto the floor. The lower level had to be sheared in half to fit the rink and create retractable seating.

As it turned out, the result was completely inadequate for the Coyotes. Three entire sections at one end of the ice hung over the boards. Fans sitting in those sections could not see  of the ice (including one of the nets) except on the video boards. The problem was so serious that after the team's first season in Phoenix, the team had to curtain off some seats in the areas where the view was particularly obstructed, cutting listed capacity from around 18,000 seats to 16,210.

The Coyotes added a second video board for an area where the view was particularly obstructed. They also put up numerous proposals to improve sight lines and boost the seating capacity back over the 17,000 mark. They also had to sell many obstructed-view tickets at a reduced price. Additionally, an unfavorable lease caused further financial troubles that impacted the team for much of the time they played at the arena. These were factors in driving them into bankruptcy in 2009. The Coyotes moved into Gila River Arena nearly midway through the 2003–04 NHL season.

Renovations 
Footprint Center underwent its second significant renovation in its history. The Phoenix City Council approved the plan on January 23, 2019, involving the arena, with the Phoenix Suns paying up to $80 million alongside any overrun costs. The first renovation, completed in March 2003, had a  air-conditioned glass-enclosed atrium built on the northwest side of the arena. That $67 million project was constructed to keep patrons cool while waiting in line for tickets or spending time inside the building before events. The arena upgrades have been done as part of the Suns' plan to keep it economically competitive after Gila River Arena opened. Former Suns owner Jerry Colangelo originally thought of the renovations after visiting Staples Center in Los Angeles and envisioned a similar entertainment district in Phoenix.

COVID-19 Pandemic 
The COVID-19 pandemic forced a pause to the Suns' 2019–20 season and allowed for an early start to the most recent renovations. Up to 80% of all planned work was completed in time for the 2020 preseason home opener, a 112–107 loss to the Los Angeles Lakers on December 16, 2020. The Mercury originally planned to play their 2020 WNBA season home games at Arizona Veterans Memorial Coliseum, but relocated all of the season's games to the IMG Academy in Bradenton, Florida. The Rattlers had their 2020 IFL season cancelled, but played their first home game of the 2021 season on June 12, 2021, against the Tucson Sugar Skulls.

Use by City Council 
Members of the Phoenix City Council were criticized in 2022 for using a suite in Footprint Center to watch games and concerts. The council subsequently voted to consider leasing out the suite.

Naming rights
The original arena naming rights contract was sold in January 1990 to Tempe-based America West Airlines. The venue was known as America West Arena from its opening until 2006.

The previous year, America West purchased rival carrier US Airways. Although America West was the surviving airline, it took the US Airways name as did the venue. This was the second arena that the company owned the naming rights after the now-demolished US Airways Arena (formerly Capital Centre) in Landover, Maryland.

Talking Stick Resort in nearby Scottsdale secured the new naming rights with an official announcement outside the Casino Arizona Pavilion on December 2, 2014.

The name change to Talking Stick Resort Arena was completed in September 2015, in time for the start of the 2015–16 Phoenix Suns season.

After negotiations on a contract extension stalled earlier on in the year due to the COVID-19 pandemic in Arizona, Talking Stick Resort officially announced the naming rights deal expired on November 6, 2020. Until a new agreement was reached, the venue was known as Phoenix Suns Arena; prior to this, it was briefly known as PHX Arena.

On July 16, 2021, it was announced that Gilbert-based materials science company Footprint had secured the arena naming rights, naming it the Footprint Center as part of a long-term partnership with the Suns ownership and the company.

See also

 List of historic properties in Phoenix, Arizona

References

External links

 

1992 establishments in Arizona
Basketball venues in Arizona
Defunct indoor ice hockey venues in the United States
Defunct National Hockey League venues
Indoor soccer venues in the United States
Music venues in Arizona
National Basketball Association venues
Phoenix Mercury venues
Phoenix Points of Pride
Phoenix Suns venues
Sports venues completed in 1992
Sports venues in Phoenix, Arizona
Indoor arenas in Arizona
Arizona Coyotes